Abu Geraniyeh, also rendered as Abu Gereyneh and Abu Gereyniyeh, may refer to:
 Abu Geraniyeh 1
 Abu Geraniyeh 2